KW Titans (formally known as Kitchener-Waterloo Titans Basketball Club) are a professional basketball team based in Regional Municipality of Waterloo and competing the National Basketball League of Canada.  The team plays its home games at Kitchener Memorial Auditorium Complex.  It was founded in 2016 by an ownership group made up of Ball Construction and a local entrepreneur, Leon Martin.

History 
On June 28, 2016, National Basketball League of Canada announced an approved expansion team to represent the Regional Municipality of Waterloo while still in the process of negotiating a lease with Kitchener Memorial Auditorium Complex. A new ownership group was composed by several local businesses with the majority ownership going to Ball Construction and a minority stake held by Leon Martin, Jeff Berg and Brian Foster. Ball Construction's chief financial officer, Frank Schneider, was named team president in representing the ownership group in team dealings. The team name was determined through a contest and announced on July 29.  On August 23, the team announced that they would play their home games at Kitchener Memorial Auditorium Complex, unveiled their new uniforms, named Serge Langis as their first coach, and announced their first player signings.

In the first game of their first season, the Titans lost to the Orangeville A's 110–105 at home. The team finished their season with 18 wins and 22 losses, finishing third in the Central Division. The team qualified for the playoffs but lost all three games in the first round to the Windsor Express.

The team opened their second season on November 18, 2017, against the Windsor Express with Serge Langis returning as the head coach. However, Langis was released during the season after a 5–22 record and replaced by former Titans' player Cavell Johnson.

The 2019–2020 season was curtailed before the postseason due to the onset of the COVID-19 pandemic and the following season was cancelled entirely. Before the 2021–22 season, head coach Johnson resigned from his coaching positions with the team to due to other commitments.
There was no season in 2020-2021 due to the ongoing pandemic lockdowns.

The 2021-2022 season finally got off the ground in February 2022 after another provincial COVID-19 Lockdown. This the best season in franchise history finishing with a .500 regular season winning percentage, the team went all the way to the NBLC Finals, ultimately losing to the London Lightning. Mel Kobe was hired as VP of Basketball Operations & General Manager and former Windsor Express assistant coach Neal Foreman as Head Coach and Director of Player Personnel.

All-star Weekend returned with the NBLC Allstars taking on The Basketball League (TBL) Allstars.

3 Titans were named to the NBLC team roster:

 Eric Ferguson - Also competed in 3pt competition
 Joel Kindred
 Chad Frazier

8 KW athletes were nominated for regular season individual awards. 4 of them came away with hardware.

Season-by-season record

Current roster

References

External links
 

 
National Basketball League of Canada teams
Basketball teams in Ontario
Sport in the Regional Municipality of Waterloo
2016 establishments in Ontario
Basketball teams established in 2016